The Canton of Sainte-Luce is a former canton in the Arrondissement of Le Marin on Martinique. It had 10,083 inhabitants (2012). It was disbanded in 2015. The canton comprised the commune of Sainte-Luce.

References

Cantons of Martinique